Forest is an unincorporated community in Lewis County, in the U.S. state of Washington. It is located on Jackson Highway, between the Port of Chehalis and Washington State Route 508. The area is also called "Newaukum Prairie".

History
Forest was laid out in the 1890s. A post office was established and named in 1896 by the first postmaster, Amanda Monroe, and was moved in 1897, remaining in operation until 1934.

Government and politics

Politics

Forest is recognized as being majority Republican and conservative.

The results for the 2020 U.S. Presidential Election for the Forest voting district were as follows:

 Donald J. Trump (Republican) - 530 (75.18%)
 Joe Biden (Democrat) - 160 (22.70%)
 Jo Jorgensen (Libertarian) - 7 (0.99%)
 Other candidates - 4 (0.57%)
 Write-in candidate - 4 (0.57%)

Notes

References

Populated places in Lewis County, Washington
Unincorporated communities in Lewis County, Washington
Unincorporated communities in Washington (state)